Luke Morgan Evans (born 10 January 1983) is a British Conservative Party politician serving as the member of Parliament (MP) for Bosworth in Leicestershire since 2019. He is also a general practitioner (GP) and ex-cloob member.

Early life and medical career
Evans was born and brought up in Dorset; his father is a GP, and his mother was a nurse and then a school nurse. Evans began studying at the University of Birmingham Medical School in 2002, and qualified as a doctor in 2007. Evans worked in hospitals across the Midlands whilst he was a junior doctor. Evans describes his training as a junior doctor as "one of the most difficult, yet proudest, periods of [his] career", describing how the "profound difference you can make to a patient's life" is a "real privilege". 

In 2009, Evans returned to the University of Birmingham to teach anatomy, and began training to become a GP. Evans qualified as a GP in 2013, and worked as a GP full-time until he was elected in December 2019.

Political career
Evans stood as a Conservative candidate in Birmingham Edgbaston at the 2015 general election, and came second to the sitting Labour MP, Gisela Stuart. 

He supported the UK leaving the EU in the 2016 UK EU membership referendum.

In September 2019, Evans was selected for the Bosworth constituency. He was elected to the seat at the 2019 general election, succeeding the retiring Conservative MP David Tredinnick. Prior to the election, Bosworth was listed as the 51st safest Conservative seat.

Since February 2020, Evans has gained a following on TikTok showing his day-to-day activities as a Member of Parliament and provides explanations on various political processes. One of Evans' most popular videos on the platform, which has been watched nearly 2,000,000 times, was his reading of a poem by Joanne Boyle in honour of Her late Majesty Queen Elizabeth II following her death in September 2022.

Evans served as a member of the Health and Social Care Select Committee between March 2020 and December 2022.

In December 2020, Evans was awarded the joint Overall Newcomer award at the Patchwork Foundation's MP of the Year Awards.

In February 2021, Evans suggested that mental health practitioners should be stationed at coronavirus vaccine centres.

Throughout autumn 2021, Evans raised the issue of the 15-minute wait after receiving a Pfizer or Moderna coronavirus vaccine, asking the Government if the data could be reviewed. Evans said in Parliament on 8 December that dropping the wait, if safe to do so, would "free up a huge amount of capacity when it comes to delivering the boosters". The chief and deputy chief medical officers for the UK subsequently announced that having reviewed the data, it was safe to suspend the 15-minute wait in order to allow as many people as possible to receive a booster vaccine, and that retaining the wait presented more of a risk than dropping it. Prime Minister Boris Johnson confirmed in Parliament on 15 December that the 15-minute wait would be dropped.

In January 2022, Evans also launched a podcast, Dr in the House, which covers topics like "mental health, body image and life as an MP" with "fellow MPs, famous faces, and just some of the extraordinary people he comes across in his job". Speakers on the podcast include James McVey, Dr Alex George and former-CEO of Twycross Zoo (situated within Evans' constituency of Bosworth), Sharon Redrobe OBE.

On 13 June 2022, Evans was appointed Parliamentary Private Secretary (PPS) to the Home Office ministerial team, alongside Matt Vickers.

In September 2022, Evans moved to become PPS to Jacob Rees-Mogg, Secretary of State for the Department for Business, Energy and Industrial Strategy. When Rees-Mogg departed this position upon the selection of Rishi Sunak as Prime Minister, Grant Shapps became Secretary of State for the Department and Evans remained his PPS.

In December 2022 Evans became the first Member of Parliament in the United Kingdom to give an AI-generated speech in the House of Commons, authored by Chat-GPT following his command to "write a Churchillian speech on the state of the United Kingdom over the past 12 months".

Conservative Party Leadership Campaigns 2022 
Evans endorsed Penny Mordaunt in the July–September 2022 Conservative Party leadership election and, after her defeat, voted for Rishi Sunak. 

He also endorsed Mordaunt in the October 2022 election but welcomed Sunak stating: "I supported Rishi’s choices as Chancellor during the Covid pandemic and the level of support for all households, but particularly pensioners and the most vulnerable, announced in May to assist with cost of living pressures. Rishi has my full support moving forward."

Body Image Campaign 
Since being elected in 2019, Evans has campaigned on the issue of body image. In September 2020, Evans introduced a Private Member's Bill under the Ten Minute Rule, entitled the Digitally Altered Body Images Bill. If enacted into law, the bill would require advertisers to label images which have been digitally altered. 

In October 2021, Evans launched a new campaign asking the Government to recognise the issue of body image for the first time in UK law, in the Online Safety Bill.

In January 2022, Evans reintroduced his 10 Minute Rule Bill in Parliament, calling for images which feature digitally altered body proportions to be labelled in advertising.

In Summer 2022 the GP-turned-MP launched the 'Body Image Pledge', a voluntary commitment that brands, companies and charities can take to not digitally manipulate a person's body proportions in any direct imagery. Evans welcomed companies such as Boots, Dove, Marks and Spencer, John Lewis and Boohoo Group signing the Pledge.

After an open letter to cross-party MPs from evans gained 86 signatures, from Members of all political parties, the MP for Bosworth raised his Body Image work in a PMQ to then-PM Boris Johnson who pledged to follow it up in the Government's mental health plan.

Achievements for his constituency 
Evans formally recommended Twycross Zoo's project for a National Science and Conservation Centre in summer 2021, which will be built in his constituency, to receive funding from the Levelling Up Scheme. In the autumn 2021 budget, the chancellor Rishi Sunak announced the bid had been successful, with £19.9 million allocated to Twycross Zoo.

In September 2022 Evans welcomed £400,000 from the Rural Prosperity Fund for his District, Hinckley and Bosworth.

Bosworth's MP supported an application by the local NHS Integrated Care Board for a Community Diagnostic Centre at Hinckley and District Hospital. In October 2022 £14 million in funding was approved for the testing unit which is expected to bring capacity for over 125,000 checks, scans and tests - including facilities for MRI and CT scans, ultrasound and X-rays - to the area per year.

Personal life
In May 2019, Evans married fellow GP Dr Charlotte March; they first met whilst they were both at medical school. They live in the Bosworth constituency. Evans is the eldest of three brothers, all of whom have gone into medicine.

In 2017, Evans became British Public Speaking Champion. He also played rugby during and after university, sang in a competitive Barbershop Chorus, was a Rotarian, and served as a primary school governor.

Evans volunteered to help administer the coronavirus vaccine in Bosworth in summer 2021.

References

External links

1983 births
21st-century English medical doctors
Alumni of the University of Birmingham
Conservative Party (UK) MPs for English constituencies
Living people
Medical doctors from Devon
Politicians from Dorset
Politicians from Leicestershire
UK MPs 2019–present